Doctor (Hangul: 닥터) is a South Korean body horror film written and directed by Kim Sung-hong, starring Kim Chang-wan in the lead role of a plastic surgeon who performs strange body experiments on his victims. A woman then goes to the plastic surgeon to seek out the perfect body. Through the surgery the women does receive the perfect body but also must now live out two separate lives. Actress Bae So-eun made her debut with the film. The film had its world premiere at the 17th Busan International Film Festival.

It was released in South Korea on 20 June 2013.

Plot 

Choi In-beom (Kim Chang-wan) is a plastic surgeon married to Soon-jung (Bae So-eun). He is a psychopathic doctor who has different mood swings. One fine day, he leaves for a surgery and tells his wife that he would be late in arriving home. As he leaves, Soon-jung shows her real side and hatred for her. She gets a call from Yong-kwan (Seo Gun-woo), who later arrives at her home. Still there, In-beom secretly enters his house to find out about the guy and witnesses Soon-jung committing adultery. He feels betrayed and tries to kill her, but her mother rings the doorbell and both In-beom and Yong-kwan escape separately. The latter is spotted by the mother who asks Soon-jung to calm down. It is revealed that Soon-jung's mother planned the marriage so that she could herself get whatever luxuries she wanted and to get her daughter, a cosmetic surgery.

In-beom follows Yong-kwan and finds out about him. Yong-kwan is visited by Soon-jung's mother who warns him not to meet her again. In-beom soon visits her and tricks her into giving her a BOTOX injection, and instead kills her. At night, he gifts Soon-jung with a special meat and as she eats it, he laughs and reveals that it was her mother's thigh. Shocked, Soon-jung threatens In-beom with a knife. In-beom breaks a bottle over her head, leaving her unconscious and drags her into a dark room.

In-beom's mood swings make his nurses suspect him. He is soon visited by a young lady willing to get a breast surgery, whom he decides to surgically enhance to take Soon-jung's place and starts the surgery without the consent of one of his senior nurses. As she refuses to help him, he kills her along with another nurse who decides to stop the surgery in between. The lady dies due to lack of proper treatment. Nurse Kim gets shocked to find blood and dead bodies. As she is about to leave, In-beom fantasizes her to be Soon-jung and tries to kill her but she escapes and eventually calls the police. In the meanwhile, Yong-kwan finds out about In-beom and breaks into his house to find Soon-jung bound and gagged. He takes her to a hospital. In the meanwhile, the police start investigating and discover that Soon-jung is actually a copy of another lady.

While in hospital, In-beom secretly injects Soon-jung with a special drug, making her unable to speak. Yong-kwan too gets injected and beaten down badly by him. He slashes Soon-jung's left eyelid and rest of her face, and leaves amidst chaos and police looking for him.

After an year, a patient with a plastic surgery comes to the doctor's cabin and as his face is being revealed, a flashback shows that In-beom had killed a roadside man and taken his identity card, not before injuring his own face severely. As he now asks for a mirror to see his face, the doctor asks him if he's satisfied. In-beom shows his satisfaction but speaks out that he used to like his name, In-beom, a lot. He starts laughing and the camera cuts to black before his new face is seen.

Cast 
Kim Chang-wan as Choi In-beom
 Bae So-eun as Park Soon-jeong

Reactions 

In the year 2015, the lead actor Kim Chang-wan in an interview said that his decision to star in the film was a mistake and he had done so only to find out the mentality of the people who try to make this movie.

Actress Bae So-eun caught the audience attention due to her graphic nudity in the film.

Reception 

Paul Quinn from Hangul Celluloid wrote "With 'Missing' having appeared to point to Kim Seong-hong as a director with a talent for realising visceral narratives in almost shocking but nonetheless gripping form, I for one was hopeful that 'Doctor' would further build his reputation within the horror genre. Sadly, though 'Doctor' is indeed notable it is so for largely the wrong reasons."
A reviewer at HanCinema wrote "Doctor might be an interesting enough thriller while it establishes its elements, which are not groundbreaking by any stretch."

References

External links 

2013 horror thriller films
2013 films
2013 horror films
South Korean horror thriller films
South Korean action horror films
South Korean psychological horror films
2010s action horror films
Films about marriage
Films about surgeons
South Korean films about revenge
Adultery in films
Body horror films
Films about cannibalism
2010s psychological horror films
South Korean slasher films
Splatter films
Films shot in South Korea
2010s South Korean films